Wang Zeshan (born 10 October 1935) is a Chinese scientist, who specializes in development of new explosives. He is a full professor at Nanjing University of Science and Technology. Often called the “King of Explosives” and “Chinese Alfred Nobel”, his research had significant impact on both civilian and military application of explosives, and he is credited with helping to increase the launch range of Chinese's artillery by more than 20 percent. He is the recipient of 2017 Highest Science and Technology Award, which is China's highest scientific award. He is a member of Chinese Academy of Engineering since 1999.

One of the main topics of his research was reuse of waste energetic materials. He is also described as the founder the theory of propellant charges. Wang has published more than 15 books and more than 100 scientific articles during his lifetime. He is said to spend 12 hours a day in his laboratory, despite his age.

References 

1935 births
Living people
People from Jilin City
National University of Defense Technology alumni
Members of the Chinese Academy of Engineering
20th-century Chinese scientists
21st-century Chinese scientists
Scientists from Jilin
Academic staff of Nanjing University of Science and Technology